Canfor Corporation is an integrated forest products company based in Vancouver, British Columbia.

History
The company traces its roots to the late 1930s when brothers-in-law John G. Prentice and L.L.G. "Poldi" Bentley (surname changed from Bloch-Bauer of the famous Bloch-Bauer family of Vienna, Austria) and their families left their native Austria just before the outbreak of World War II. They settled in Vancouver and built a small mill that was the beginning of the more than 75-year-old company.

In 2006, the company was subject to a proxy fight between billionaires Jim Pattison and Stephen A. Jarislowsky, who owned 30% and 18% of the firm's shares, respectively. Pattison won and ousted CEO Jim Shepherd over Canfor's poor performance and declining share price, which saw Jim Pattison appointed interim CEO.

Current status

Poldi Bentley's son Peter Bentley (1930-2021) was the Chairman Emeritus of the Board of Directors. Canfor produces softwood lumber, specialty wood products, and engineered wood products. Canfor also owns a controlling share in Canfor Pulp Limited, which produces northern softwood kraft pulp and kraft paper in BC.

As of 2016, the company has an annual production capability of 5.9 billion board feet of lumber, 1.1 million tonnes of northern softwood market kraft pulp, approximately 220,000 tonnes of BCTMP and 140,000 tonnes of kraft paper.

Operations or offices are located in:

On November 15, 2018 Canfor announced that it had entered into an agreement to acquire a 70% share of the Vida Group, a wood products company based in Sweden.  The prior owners of Vida maintain a 30% share and manage day-to-day operations.

Canfor formerly owned the Englewood Railway on Vancouver Island, but sold it to Western Forest Products in 2006.

Canfor has 6,380 employees as of 2016.

Canfor is a member of the Forest Products Association of Canada.

References

External links
 Canfor Corporation website
 Canfor Careers website
 Canfor Pulp website

Companies based in Vancouver
Companies listed on the Toronto Stock Exchange
Pulp and paper companies of Canada